The National Union of Popular Forces (UNFP) was founded in 1959 in Morocco by Mehdi Ben Barka and his entourage, because they found that the Istiqlal Party was not radical enough.

Espousing socialist policies, the party took a strongly critical line towards the ruling monarchy, and consequently faced severe police repression, led by interior minister general Mohamed Oufkir. The UNFP had a diverse leadership: while Abderrahim Bouabid, and Abderrahmane Youssoufi were considered moderates, Fqih Basri was promoting armed struggle, and Ben Barka chose to oppose the rule from exile. When the Sand War broke out between Morocco and Algeria in 1963, Ben Barka, then in Algeria, officially sided with Ahmed Ben Bella's FLN government. This was seen as high treason by the Moroccan government, and he was sentenced to death in absentia. He later "disappeared" in exile in France, possibly on Oufkir's orders, in a case that remains a powerful if hotly debated symbol of the democratic struggle in Morocco.

The UNFP later broke apart again, with one wing restyling itself the Socialist Union of Popular Forces (Union Socialiste des Forces Populaires, USFP), which survives still today as a centre-left party. In the elections of 1993 USFP and Istiqlal worked together and were both opposition parties. Since 1998, the USFP is the main coalition party of the "Alternance government".

Abderrahmane Youssoufi, one of the founders of the UNFP, and later the chairman of the USFP, who was once a political prisoner and condemned to death, in 1998 became head of government through elections. This — one of the first cases in modern Arab history of a head of government being selected from among the opposition — was viewed as a major breakthrough for Morocco's reform process.

A small group led by Abdallah Ibrahim maintained the UNFP denomination until his death in 2005; it boycotted all elections since 1972.

Offshoots
Tanzim was a radical branch of the National Union of Popular Forces party, with a revolutionary tendency. Tanzim was created in 1969-1970, with an influence from the Palestinian resistance and a support from many Panarabist republican regimes (Syria, Algeria, Libya).

References

1959 establishments in Morocco
2005 disestablishments in Morocco
Defunct political parties in Morocco
Moroccan nationalism
Political parties disestablished in 2005
Political parties established in 1959
Republican parties
Republicanism in Morocco
Socialist parties in Morocco